The Rosebuds Make Out is The Rosebuds' first studio album, released in 2003.

Track listing
 "Back to Boston" – 2:28
 "Kicks in the Schoolyard" – 2:28
 "My Downtown Friends" – 2:17
 "Wishes for Kisses" – 3:15
 "Boys Who Love Girls" – 2:20
 "Drunkards Worst Nightmare" – 3:44
 "Big Heartbreak" – 3:34
 "Waiting for the Carnival" – 3:54
 "What Can I Do?" – 2:08
 "Signature Drinks" – 4:36
 "Make Out Song" – 5:49

Personnel
 Ivan Howard – vocals/guitars
 Kelly Crisp – keyboards
 Billy Alphin – drums
 Jonathan Bass – drums
 Jim Brantley – dobro
 Tyler Kendall – cornet

References

2003 debut albums
The Rosebuds albums
Merge Records albums